British actor Dev Patel made his screen debut as Anwar Kharral in the first two seasons of the British television teen drama Skins (2007–08), landing the role with no prior professional acting experience. His breakthrough came in 2008, when he played the lead role in Danny Boyle's Best Picture drama Slumdog Millionaire as Jamal Malik, which earned him BAFTA and SAG Award nominations for Best Actor and Best Supporting Actor, respectively. Patel went on to star in the universally panned 2010 fantasy film The Last Airbender, followed by the commercially successful romantic comedy and surprise box-office hit, The Best Exotic Marigold Hotel (2012)—the former earned him a Golden Raspberry Award for Worst Supporting Actor nomination. Returning to the small screen, Patel starred in the HBO television series The Newsroom (2012–14) and received a NAACP Image Award nomination for Outstanding Supporting Actor in a Drama Series for his portrayal of the character Neal Sampat.

In 2015, Patel reprised his role as Sonny Kapoor in The Second Best Exotic Marigold Hotel (sequel to the 2012 film), led the science fiction crime thriller film Chappie, and portrayed the mathematician Srinivasa Ramanujan in the biopic The Man Who Knew Infinity to a mostly positive reception. The following year, he played Saroo Brierley in the biographical drama Lion (2016) and won the BAFTA Award for Best Supporting Actor—his performance garnered additional nominations for an Academy Award, a Golden Globe, and a SAG Award,  which he did not win. For his portrayal of David Copperfield in the 2019 comedy-drama The Personal History of David Copperfield, Patel earned his second BIFA and Golden Globe nominations, for Best Actor and Best Actor in a Motion Picture – Musical or Comedy respectively.

In 2020, Patel appeared in the Amazon Prime Video anthology series Modern Love as Joshua, a successful young entrepreneur, and received his first Primetime Emmy Award nomination for Outstanding Guest Actor in a Comedy Series at the 72nd ceremony.

Awards and nominations

See also
 List of accolades received by Slumdog Millionaire
 List of accolades received by Lion

References

External links
 

Patel, Dev